Plicochonetes is an extinct genus of brachiopods in the extinct family Rugosochonetidae.

Chonetes elegans L. G. de Koninck, 1847 is a synonym for Plicochonetes elegans (L.G. de Koninck, 1847)

References

External links 

 

Prehistoric brachiopod genera
Productida